George Seabrook Bryan (May 22, 1809 – September 28, 1905) was a United States district judge of the United States District Court for the District of South Carolina.

Education and career

Born in Charleston, South Carolina, Bryan read law to enter the bar.

Federal judicial service

On February 9, 1866, Bryan was nominated by President Andrew Johnson to a seat on the United States District Court for the District of South Carolina vacated by Judge Andrew Gordon Magrath. Bryan was confirmed by the United States Senate on March 12, 1866, and received his commission the same day. Bryan's service was terminated on September 1, 1886, due to his retirement.

Death

Bryan died on September 28, 1905, in Flat Rock, Henderson County, North Carolina.

References

Sources
 

1809 births
1905 deaths
Judges of the United States District Court for the District of South Carolina
United States federal judges appointed by Andrew Johnson
19th-century American judges
People from Charleston, South Carolina
People from Flat Rock, Henderson County, North Carolina